Lawrence Harvey Brown (born September 14, 1940) is an American basketball coach and former player who is currently an assistant coach of the Memphis Tigers. Brown is the only coach in basketball history to win both an NCAA national championship (Kansas Jayhawks, 1988) and an NBA title (Detroit Pistons, 2004). He has a 1,275–965 lifetime professional coaching record in the American Basketball Association (ABA) and the National Basketball Association (NBA) and is the only coach in NBA history to lead eight teams (differing franchises) to the playoffs. He also won an ABA championship as a player with the Oakland Oaks in the 1968–69 season, and an Olympic Gold Medal in 1964. He is also the only person ever to coach two NBA franchises in the same season (Spurs and Clippers during the 1991–92 NBA season). Before coaching, Brown played collegiately at the University of North Carolina and professionally in the ABA.

Brown was enshrined in the Basketball Hall of Fame as a coach on September 27, 2002. On July 8, 2021, the National Basketball Coaches Association awarded Brown the Chuck Daly Lifetime Achievement Award.

Early life and early basketball accomplishments
Brown is Jewish and was born in Brooklyn, New York. His maternal grandfather Hittelman was from Minsk, Belarus, and his mother's family immigrated to the United States in 1910 and opened a bakery in Brooklyn.  His mother met his father Milton Brown, a furniture salesman, when she was 26 years old.  He has an older brother, Herbert, who has been an NBA head coach. In 1947 his father died suddenly of a ruptured aneurysm.  His family moved first to Brooklyn, then to Long Beach, New York, on Long Island.  His mother lived until the age of 106.

A  point guard, Brown attended Long Beach High School. He won a gold medal with Team USA in basketball at the 1961 Maccabiah Games in Israel, on a team that included Art Heyman and Charley Rosen.

Brown attended University of North Carolina, where he played basketball under legendary coaches Frank McGuire and Dean Smith. Brown was an All-Atlantic Coast Conference player in 1963.

Playing career
A stellar player for the Tar Heels in the early 1960s, Brown was considered too small to play in the NBA. He began his post-college career with the NABL's Akron Wingfoots, where he played for two years (1964–65). He led the Wingfoots to the 1964 AAU National Championship. Brown was selected for Team USA's 1964 Summer Olympics team, which won the gold medal.

After a brief stint as an assistant coach at North Carolina, Brown joined the upstart American Basketball Association, playing with the New Orleans Buccaneers (1967–68), Oakland Oaks (1968–69), Washington Caps (1969–70), Virginia Squires (1970–71), and Denver Rockets (1971–72). Brown was named MVP of the ABA's first All-Star Game in 1968, and was named to the All-ABA Second Team the same year. Brown led the ABA in assists per game during the league's first three seasons, and when he ended his playing career, Brown was the ABA's all-time assist leader. His total of 2,509 assists places him seventh on the ABA's career list, and he holds the ABA record for assists in a game with 23. He was a three-time ABA All-Star.

Coaching and management career

Early years: 1969–1983
Brown's first head coaching job was at Davidson College in North Carolina in 1969. He resigned after less than two months, having never fielded a team or coached a game. He would not discuss the reasons for his resignation, saying only that "it was in the best interests of Davidson and myself".

Brown moved on to the ABA and coached with the Carolina Cougars and then the Denver Nuggets, who later joined the NBA in 1976, for five and a half seasons from 1974 to 1979. He then moved on to coach for UCLA (1979–1981), leading his freshman-dominated 1979–80 team to the NCAA title game before falling to Louisville, 59–54. However, that appearance was later vacated by the NCAA after two UCLA players were found to be ineligible—one of the few times a Final Four squad has had its record vacated. Brown was the head coach for the NBA's New Jersey Nets for two years following that, from 1981 to 1983.

University of Kansas: 1983–1988
Brown began his tenure at the University of Kansas (1983–1988), replacing the fired Ted Owens, who had overseen back-to-back losing seasons in 1981–82 and 1982–83. Brown's impact was felt almost immediately, as the 1983–84 Jayhawks put together a 22–10 record, finished in second place in that year's Big 8 standings, upset Oklahoma to win the 1984 Big 8 Tournament, and advanced to the 1984 NCAA Tournament's Round of 32 before losing to Wake Forest. In the meantime Brown signed the most coveted high school player in the country, Danny Manning, to play for KU after signing his father, Ed Manning, to a position as an assistant coach.

Perhaps Brown's finest team at Kansas was the 1985–86 team. This squad put together a 35–4 record, the first 30-win season in KU history. They won the Big 8 regular season title for the first time since 1978, defeated Iowa State to win the 1986 Big 8 Tournament, and advanced to the 1986 Final Four before losing to Duke in the semifinals.

In the 1987–88 season, Kansas got off to a mediocre 12–8 start, including 1–4 in the Big 8, and the end of the Jayhawks' 55-game homecourt winning streak in Allen Fieldhouse. Ultimately, behind the high-scoring of Danny Manning, KU rallied to win nine of their next twelve games to finish third place in the Big 8 and qualify for the 1988 NCAA tournament as a 6-seed in the Midwest Regional. Kansas then proceeded to defeat 11th-seed Xavier, 14th-seed Murray State, and 7th-seed Vanderbilt before meeting rival Kansas State, which had beaten KU twice in three meetings that year. KU upset the 4th-seeded Wildcats 71–58 in the Elite Eight to reach the Final Four in Kansas City's Kemper Arena. Once there, Kansas upset the East Region's #2 seed Duke, 66–59, avenging an overtime loss at home to the Blue Devils earlier in the season. Two nights later, the Jayhawks, who became known as "Danny and the Miracles", upset the Southeast Region's #1-seed and fellow Big 8 rival Oklahoma, 83–79, to avenge a regular-season sweep by the Sooners and win the 1988 NCAA championship. Manning, who scored 31 points and grabbed 18 rebounds in the final, was named Most Outstanding Player of the Tournament. Kansas concluded the year 27–11; the 11 losses remain a record for most losses by an NCAA champion to this day.

Two months later, Brown opted to return to professional coaching, departing KU for the San Antonio Spurs. In his five seasons at Kansas, Brown had one Big 8 regular season title, two Big 8 postseason titles, five NCAA Tournament appearances, three Sweet 16 appearances, two trips to the Final Four, and one national title. As a collegiate coach, he had a cumulative coaching record of 177–61 (.744) in seven seasons, including a 135–44 (.754) record at Kansas.  His efforts led to him being named "Coach of the Year" for the NCAA in 1988 and "Coach of the Year" for the Big Eight Conference in 1986.

After Brown left Kansas to return to the NBA, NCAA sanctions were levied against Kansas in the 1988–89 season as a result of recruiting violations; potential transfer Vincent Askew was provided with money to leave his campus visit to visit his ill grandmother. No players on any of Brown's teams were named in the report, and Askew did not transfer to Kansas. The Jayhawks were given three years' probation and banned from the 1989 NCAA Tournament–to date, the only time a defending champion has been barred from defending its title. They were also docked one scholarship for the 1989–90 season, and barred from paid visits during the 1989 calendar year. As harsh as these sanctions were, the infractions committee seriously considered imposing a "death penalty" on Kansas, which would have resulted in canceling the entire 1989–90 season. Indeed, enforcement director David Berst said that Kansas was "on the bubble" for a death penalty. However, the committee opted against imposing a death penalty because Askew was the only player who received impermissible benefits, and because Brown had returned to the NBA by then.

San Antonio Spurs: 1988–1992
Brown was hired to coach the San Antonio Spurs in 1988, signing a five-year, $3.5 million contract. With Brown at the helm, the Spurs won two consecutive Midwest Division titles. In his second season, the Spurs, led by David Robinson–who finally joined the Spurs after serving his two-year naval commitment–vaulted from the worst record in franchise history to the best. Brown remained with the Spurs until he was fired on January 21, 1992.

Los Angeles Clippers: 1992–1993
On February 7, 1992, Brown was hired to coach the Los Angeles Clippers. He took a sub-.500 team in 1992 and guided them to their first winning season since the franchise moved to Los Angeles and their first playoff berth since they were the Buffalo Braves.  He followed that up the next season with another playoff appearance in 1993.  Brown resigned his position on May 21, 1993.

Indiana Pacers: 1993–1997
Brown was hired by the Indiana Pacers in June 1993. Under Brown, the Pacers went to two straight conference finals, their first ever.  He resigned his position in 1997.

Philadelphia 76ers: 1997–2003
Brown was hired as head coach of the Philadelphia 76ers in 1997. Under his leadership, the team reached the 2001 NBA Finals. Brown was named NBA Coach of the Year following the 2000–2001 season. Brown resigned his post in 2003. Brown also served as Director of Basketball Operations in Philadelphia.

In 2005, Allen Iverson, who frequently clashed with Brown when he played for him in Philadelphia, said that he was without a doubt "the best coach in the world."

Detroit Pistons: 2003–2005
Brown won his first (and ultimately only) NBA Championship during his first year with the Detroit Pistons in 2004, defeating the Los Angeles Lakers four games to one in the 2004 NBA Finals. By doing so, Brown became the first, and so far only, coach to lead teams to both NCAA and NBA titles. Brown is also the only NBA coach to take two teams (76ers and Pistons) to the NBA Finals against the same opponent (Los Angeles Lakers in 2001 and 2004), lose the first time, and win the second.

In May 2005, rumors surfaced that Brown would become the Cleveland Cavaliers' team president as soon as the Detroit Pistons finished their postseason. The rumor, which was not dispelled by Brown, became a major distraction as the Pistons lost to the San Antonio Spurs in seven games in the 2005 NBA Finals.

On July 19, 2005, the Pistons—displeased with Brown's public flirtations with other teams—bought out the remaining years of Brown's contract, allowing him to sign with another team. A week later, on July 28, 2005, Brown became the head coach of the New York Knicks, with a 5-year contract reportedly worth between US$50 million and $60 million, making him the highest-paid coach in NBA history.

New York Knicks: 2005–2006

On January 13, 2006, the Knicks beat the Atlanta Hawks to give Brown his 1,000th win in the NBA, making him only the fourth coach to do so (at the time, the other three were Lenny Wilkens, Don Nelson, and Pat Riley; coincidentally, all three had coached the Knicks at various points).

Brown's tenure as Knicks head coach lasted one season. The Knicks fired him on June 23, 2006, after he led the team to a 23–59 record. Brown's season with the Knicks was marred by public feuds with his own players, most notably point guard Stephon Marbury. After the firing, the Knicks declined to pay the remaining sum (more than $40 million) under Brown's contract on the grounds that he had been terminated for cause. Before the contract dispute was to be heard by NBA Commissioner David Stern, Brown reached an agreement with the Knicks wherein the team agreed to pay him $18.5 million.

Philadelphia 76ers front office: 2007–2008
In January 2007, Brown became Executive Vice President of the Philadelphia 76ers. Brown resigned in April 2008.

Charlotte Bobcats: 2008–2010
On April 29, 2008, Brown signed to become the head coach of the Charlotte Bobcats – his ninth NBA coaching job.  He managed to keep the relatively young team in playoff contention. The following season, Brown guided the Bobcats to the franchise's first ever playoff appearance. Charlotte was the eighth team he had led to the postseason, an NBA record.

On December 22, 2010, Brown parted ways with the Bobcats after the team started the 2010–2011 season with a record of 9–19. His departure was officially characterized as a resignation, but other sources reported that Brown was fired. Assistant coach Jeff Capel II told The Charlotte Observer that the entire coaching staff had been fired.

He returned to Lawrence, Kansas to coach in an exhibition match on September 24, 2011 for the "Legends of the Phog" event, opposite Ted Owens, in which various Kansas Jayhawks Basketball alumni played an exhibition game during the 2011 NBA lockout.

Southern Methodist University: 2012–2016
On April 17, 2012, ESPN reported that Brown was to be named the new head coach of the SMU Mustangs, replacing Matt Doherty, who had been fired from SMU earlier in March. Tim Jankovich, the head coach of Illinois State, was hired as the coach-in-waiting.

After a rebuilding season in 2012–2013 (15–17), Brown brought SMU into the national conversation the following year, as the school made its first appearance in The Associated Press Top 25 rankings since 1985. SMU went on to be the overall number one seed in the National Invitational Tournament, losing in the final game of the tournament to Minnesota, and finished the year with a record of 27–10. In the following 2014–2015 season, SMU won the American Athletic Conference tournament and secured its first NCAA Tournament appearance since 1993.

On September 29, 2015, Brown was suspended by the NCAA for 30% of the Mustangs' games in the upcoming 2015–2016 season, and the team was banned from 2016 post-season play, placed on probation for three years, and lost nine scholarships over a three-year period. The NCAA found that Brown failed to report violations when a former administrative assistant committed academic fraud on behalf of a student-athlete and he initially lied to enforcement staff about his knowledge of the potential violations.

On July 8, 2016, Brown announced his resignation as head basketball coach.

Auxilium Torino: 2018
On June 12, 2018, Brown accepted the proposal of Auxilium Torino to become the new head coach of the Italian basketball club of the Lega Basket Serie A (LBA). On June 17, he officially became new head coach of Torino. He was fired midseason on December 27 with the team's record at just 5–19.

University of Memphis: 2021–2022
In June 2021, Brown joined the coaching staff of the Memphis Tigers men's basketball program, as an assistant coach under head coach and former NBA player Penny Hardaway. Brown had most recently served as an assistant coach in 1967. After the 2021–22 season, Brown transitioned to an advisory role for Memphis before stepping down mid-season due to health concerns.

United States National Team
Brown was chosen as the head coach for the United States men's basketball team at the 2004 Summer Olympics. That team won the bronze medal at the Olympics; it was the first U.S. men's basketball team to fail to win gold at a Summer Olympics since NBA players began playing on the U.S. men's team in 1992.

Head coaching record

ABA and NBA

|-
| style="text-align:left;"|Carolina
| style="text-align:left;"|1972–73
|84||57||27||.679|| style="text-align:center;"|1st in East||12||7||5||.583
| style="text-align:center;"|Lost in Division Finals
|-
| style="text-align:left;"|Carolina
| style="text-align:left;"|1973–74
|84||47||37||.560|| style="text-align:center;"|3rd in East||4||0||4||.000
| style="text-align:center;"|Lost in Division Semifinals
|-
| style="text-align:left;"|Denver
| style="text-align:left;"|1974–75
|84||65||19||.774|| style="text-align:center;"|1st in West||13||7||6||.538
| style="text-align:center;"|Lost in Division Finals
|-
| style="text-align:left;"|Denver
| style="text-align:left;"|1975–76
|84||60||24||.714|| style="text-align:center;"|1st in West||13||6||7||.462
| style="text-align:center;"|Lost in ABA Finals
|-
| style="text-align:left;"|Denver
| style="text-align:left;"|
|82||50||32||.610|| style="text-align:center;"|1st in Midwest||6||2||4||.333
| style="text-align:center;"|Lost in Conf. Semifinals
|-
| style="text-align:left;"|Denver
| style="text-align:left;"|
|82||48||34||.585|| style="text-align:center;"|1st in Midwest||13||6||7||.462
| style="text-align:center;"|Lost in Conf. Finals
|-
| style="text-align:left;"|Denver
| style="text-align:left;"|
|53||28||25||.528|| style="text-align:center;"|—||—||—||—||—
| style="text-align:center;"|—
|-
| style="text-align:left;"|New Jersey
| style="text-align:left;"|
|82||44||38||.537|| style="text-align:center;"|3rd in Atlantic||2||0||2||.000
| style="text-align:center;"|Lost in first round
|-
| style="text-align:left;"|New Jersey
| style="text-align:left;"|
|76||47||29||.618|| style="text-align:center;"|—||—||—||—||—
| style="text-align:center;"|—
|-
| style="text-align:left;"|San Antonio
| style="text-align:left;"|
|82||21||61||.256|| style="text-align:center;"|5th in Midwest||—||—||—||—
| style="text-align:center;"|Missed Playoffs
|-
| style="text-align:left;"|San Antonio
| style="text-align:left;"|
|82||56||26||.683|| style="text-align:center;"|1st in Midwest||10||6||4||.600
| style="text-align:center;"|Lost in Conf. Semifinals
|-
| style="text-align:left;"|San Antonio
| style="text-align:left;"|
|82||55||27||.671|| style="text-align:center;"|1st in Midwest||4||1||3||.250
| style="text-align:center;"|Lost in first round
|-
| style="text-align:left;"|San Antonio
| style="text-align:left;"|
|38||21||17||.553|| style="text-align:center;"|—||—||—||—||—
| style="text-align:center;"|—
|-
| style="text-align:left;"|L.A. Clippers
| style="text-align:left;"|
|35||23||12||.657|| style="text-align:center;"|5th in Pacific||5||2||3||.400
| style="text-align:center;"|Lost in first round
|-
| style="text-align:left;"|L.A. Clippers
| style="text-align:left;"|
|82||41||41||.500|| style="text-align:center;"|5th in Pacific||5||2||3||.400
| style="text-align:center;"|Lost in first round
|-
| style="text-align:left;"|Indiana
| style="text-align:left;"|
|82||47||35||.573|| style="text-align:center;"|4th in Central||16||10||6||.625
| style="text-align:center;"|Lost in Conf. Finals
|-
| style="text-align:left;"|Indiana
| style="text-align:left;"|
|82||52||30||.634|| style="text-align:center;"|1st in Central||17||10||7||.588
| style="text-align:center;"|Lost in Conf. Finals
|-
| style="text-align:left;"|Indiana
| style="text-align:left;"|
|82||52||30||.634|| style="text-align:center;"|2nd in Central||5||2||3||.400
| style="text-align:center;"|Lost in first round
|-
| style="text-align:left;"|Indiana
| style="text-align:left;"|
|82||39||43||.476|| style="text-align:center;"|6th in Central||—||—||—||—
| style="text-align:center;"|Missed Playoffs
|-
| style="text-align:left;"|Philadelphia
| style="text-align:left;"|
|82||31||51||.378|| style="text-align:center;"|7th in Atlantic||—||—||—||—
| style="text-align:center;"|Missed Playoffs
|-
| style="text-align:left;"|Philadelphia
| style="text-align:left;"|
|50||28||22||.560|| style="text-align:center;"|3rd in Atlantic||8||3||5||.375
| style="text-align:center;"|Lost in Conf. Semifinals
|-
| style="text-align:left;"|Philadelphia
| style="text-align:left;"|
|82||49||33||.598|| style="text-align:center;"|3rd in Atlantic||10||5||5||.500
| style="text-align:center;"|Lost in Conf. Semifinals
|-
| style="text-align:left;"|Philadelphia
| style="text-align:left;"|
|82||56||26||.683|| style="text-align:center;"|1st in Atlantic||23||12||11||.522
| style="text-align:center;"|Lost in NBA Finals
|-
| style="text-align:left;"|Philadelphia
| style="text-align:left;"|
|82||43||39||.524|| style="text-align:center;"|4th in Atlantic||5||2||3||.400
| style="text-align:center;"|Lost in first round
|-
| style="text-align:left;"|Philadelphia
| style="text-align:left;"|
|82||48||34||.585|| style="text-align:center;"|2nd in Atlantic||12||6||6||.500
| style="text-align:center;"|Lost in Conf. Semifinals
|- ! style="background:#FDE910;"
| style="text-align:left;"|Detroit
| style="text-align:left;"|
|82||54||28||.659|| style="text-align:center;"|2nd in Central||23||16||7||.696
| style="text-align:center;"|Won NBA Championship
|-
| style="text-align:left;"|Detroit
| style="text-align:left;"|
|82||54||28||.659|| style="text-align:center;"|1st in Central||25||15||10||.600
| style="text-align:center;"|Lost in NBA Finals
|-
| style="text-align:left;"|New York
| style="text-align:left;"|
|82||23||59||.280|| style="text-align:center;"|5th in Atlantic||—||—||—||—
| style="text-align:center;"|Missed Playoffs
|-
| style="text-align:left;"|Charlotte
| style="text-align:left;"|
|82||35||47||.427|| style="text-align:center;"|4th in Southeast||—||—||—||—
| style="text-align:center;"|Missed Playoffs
|-
| style="text-align:left;"|Charlotte
| style="text-align:left;"|
|82||44||38||.537|| style="text-align:center;"|3rd in Southeast||4||0||4||.000
| style="text-align:center;"|Lost in first round
|-
| style="text-align:left;"|Charlotte
| style="text-align:left;"|
|28||9||19||.321|| style="text-align:center;"|—||—||—||—||—
| style="text-align:center;"|—
|- class="sortbottom"
| style="text-align:center;" colspan="2"|ABA Career
| 336||229||107||.682|| ||42||20||22||.476
|- class="sortbottom"
| style="text-align:center;" colspan="2"|NBA Career
| 2,002||1,098||904||.548|| ||193||100||93||.518
|- class="sortbottom"
| style="text-align:center;" colspan="2"|Career Total
| 2,338||1,327||1,011||.568|| ||235||120||115||.511

College

Achievements
1973: Carolina Cougars: ABA Eastern Division regular season champions
1975: Denver Nuggets: ABA Western Division regular season champions
1976: Denver Nuggets: ABA regular season champions (single-division)
1977: Denver Nuggets: NBA Midwest Division Champions
1978: Denver Nuggets: NBA Midwest Division Champions
1980: UCLA: NCAA Championship Game
1984: Kansas: Big Eight Conference tournament Champions
1986: Kansas: NCAA Final Four & Big Eight Conference & Tournament Champions
1988: Kansas: NCAA National Champions
1990: San Antonio Spurs: NBA Midwest Division Champions
1991: San Antonio Spurs: NBA Midwest Division Champions
1995: Indiana Pacers: NBA Central Division Champions
2001: Philadelphia 76ers: NBA Eastern Conference Champions
2004: United States men's Olympic basketball team: Bronze medal at the Athens Olympics
2004: Detroit Pistons: NBA Champions
2005: Detroit Pistons: NBA Eastern Conference Champions
2015: SMU Mustangs: American Athletic Conference Champions
College: 1 National Championship, 3 Final Fours in 7 seasons
Pro: 1 Championship, 3 Conference Championships, 10 Division Championships, 18 Playoff appearances in 26 seasons, 1,098 career NBA wins

See also
 List of NCAA Division I Men's Final Four appearances by coach
 List of select Jewish basketball players

References

External links

 
 basketball-reference.com Coaching statistics

1940 births
Living people
Amateur Athletic Union men's basketball players
American men's basketball players
American Olympic coaches
American people of Belarusian-Jewish descent
Auxilium Pallacanestro Torino coaches
Baltimore Bullets (1963–1973) draft picks
Basketball players at the 1964 Summer Olympics
Carolina Cougars coaches
Charlotte Bobcats head coaches
College men's basketball head coaches in the United States
Denver Nuggets head coaches
Denver Rockets players
Detroit Pistons head coaches
Indiana Pacers head coaches
Jewish American sportspeople
Jewish men's basketball players
Kansas Jayhawks men's basketball coaches
Long Beach High School (New York) alumni
Los Angeles Clippers head coaches
Competitors at the 1961 Maccabiah Games
Maccabiah Games medalists in basketball
Maccabiah Games basketball players of the United States
Maccabiah Games gold medalists for the United States
Medalists at the 1964 Summer Olympics
Memphis Tigers men's basketball coaches
Naismith Memorial Basketball Hall of Fame inductees
National Basketball Association championship-winning head coaches
NCAA sanctions
New Jersey Nets head coaches
New Orleans Buccaneers players
New York Knicks head coaches
North Carolina Tar Heels men's basketball coaches
North Carolina Tar Heels men's basketball players
Oakland Oaks players
Olympic gold medalists for the United States in basketball
People from Lido Beach, New York
People from Long Beach, New York
Philadelphia 76ers head coaches
Point guards
San Antonio Spurs head coaches
SMU Mustangs men's basketball coaches
Sportspeople from Brooklyn
Basketball players from New York City
Sportspeople from Nassau County, New York
UCLA Bruins men's basketball coaches
United States men's national basketball team coaches
United States men's national basketball team players
Virginia Squires players
Washington Caps players
21st-century American Jews